Glass Pieces is a ballet choreographed by Jerome Robbins to music by Philip Glass, costumes designed by Ben Benson, lighting designed by Ronald Bates and production designed by Robbins and Bates. The ballet was premiered on May 12, 1983, at the New York State Theater, performed by the New York City Ballet.

Production
Choreographer Jerome Robbins was first invited to direct Philip Glass's opera, Akhnaten. Due to the unusual nature of the opera, Robbins decided to make a ballet with the music first and figure out the stage directions. However, due to scheduling conflict, Robbins withdrew from the opera, but went ahead with the ballet.

Though the score is minimal, Robbins decided to treat it differently. He made charts of the music's structure on graph paper, then worked with Ronald Bates, who also designed the lighting, to make backdrop that looks like a piece of graph paper. Robbins also added "Rubric" and "Façades" from Glass's Glassworks, as the scores "struck him as being markedly different in character". Robbins also claimed that since he was focused on the music during the creative process, he was surprised to see the critics interpret it as "images of urban life". On the entire ballet Robbins said it has a "a ritualistic sense" which may be "inevitable" due to Glass's music.

The ballet was the first New York City Ballet (NYCB) work set to minimalist music and premiered shortly after the company's co-founder George Balanchine's death.

Structure
The first part, "Rubric", features dancers in bright color practice wears walking across the stage, and three main couples performing different choreography. Whenever the couples enter the stage, the corps de ballet changes its movements. Robbins said it is like a rondo.

The middle section is set to "Façades", which Robbins described as "a songlike melody repeated five times". The principal couple is the equivalent of the score while an all-female corps dances at the back of the stage in a line, representing the accompaniment.

The third and final movement, danced to "Akhnaten", is called "tribal" by Robbins, with dancers performing in bloc patterns.

Original cast
Rubric:

Façades:

Revivals
Other ballet companies that have performed Glass Pieces include the Paris Opera Ballet, Joffrey Ballet and San Francisco Ballet. The former two companies and NYCB all included the ballet in their Robbins Centennial celebrations.

Videography
In light of the impact of the COVID-19 coronavirus pandemic on the performing arts, Paris Opera Ballet released a video recording of Glass Pieces as a part of the Tribute to Jerome Robbins program. NYCB released a 2017 video recording of the third movement.

References

External links
Justin Peck on Glass Pieces

1983 ballet premieres
Ballets by Jerome Robbins
Ballets designed by Ben Benson
Ballets designed by Ronald Bates
Ballets to the music of Philip Glass
New York City Ballet repertory